Cypraeovula coronata is a species of sea snail, a cowry, a marine gastropod mollusc in the family Cypraeidae, the cowries.

Description

Distribution

Subspecies
Cypraeovula coronata debruini Lorenz, 2002
Cypraeovula coronata gabriellii Lorenz, 1993
Cypraeovula coronata gloriosa Shikama, 1971
Cypraeovula coronata immaculata Raybaudi, 1986
Cypraeovula coronata infantensis Aiken, 2016

References

Cypraeidae
Gastropods described in 1930